Falkirk High railway station is one of two railway stations serving the town of Falkirk in Scotland. It is on the Glasgow to Edinburgh via Falkirk Line and situated on the southern edge of the town, close to the Union Canal.

Falkirk is also served by the railway station at Falkirk Grahamston.

History 
The station was opened as Falkirk with the Edinburgh and Glasgow Railway on 21 February 1842. The NBR took over operations in 1865 when it absorbed the E&GR, with the London and North Eastern Railway succeeding it at the 1923 Grouping.

Services 
Falkirk High station is open (and staffed) seven days per week; at off-peak times eight trains per hour stop, four for Glasgow via Croy and four for Edinburgh via Polmont and Linlithgow.  This drops to every half-hour each way in the evenings.

Journey times to Edinburgh vary from 27 minutes to 38 minutes depending on stopping stations and time of day; to Glasgow the journey time is between 18 and 26 minutes.

On Sundays there is a half-hourly service in each direction.

Train services are provided by ScotRail.

Statue 
Falkirk High station is home to the metal sculpture of "Antonine the Legendary Engine" by George Wyllie. This sculpture is of sufficient importance to be listed and protected by the Railway Heritage Committee.

References

Notes

Sources 

 
 

Railway stations in Falkirk (council area)
Former North British Railway stations
Railway stations in Great Britain opened in 1842
Railway stations served by ScotRail
Buildings and structures in Falkirk
1842 establishments in Scotland